Chadwick E. "Chad" Harting (born February 20, 1972) is a retired American pole vaulter.

He won the silver medal at the 1997 Summer Universiade. He competed at the 2000 Summer Olympics in Sydney, in the men's pole vault. His personal best jump was 5.80 metres, achieved indoors in January 2000 in Reno, Nevada.

Harting was born in St. Louis, Missouri.

References

1972 births
Living people
American male pole vaulters
Olympic track and field athletes of the United States
Athletes (track and field) at the 2000 Summer Olympics
Universiade medalists in athletics (track and field)
Track and field athletes from St. Louis
Universiade silver medalists for the United States
Medalists at the 1997 Summer Universiade